Henrik Krohn (10 May 1826 – 14 June 1879) was a Norwegian poet, magazine editor and proponent for Nynorsk language. He was born in Bergen. Among his works is the poetry collection Smaakvæde from 1867. He founded the Nynorsk organization Vestmannalaget in 1868, and edited the organization's magazine Fraa by og bygd. A collection of his works was published in 1909.

References

1826 births
1879 deaths
Writers from Bergen
19th-century Norwegian poets
Norwegian male poets
Norwegian magazine editors
Nynorsk
19th-century journalists
Male journalists
19th-century Norwegian male writers